Troon is a town in South Ayrshire, Scotland.

Troon may also refer to:

Troon, Arizona, a housing development in Arizona, United States
Troon, Cornwall, a village in Cornwall, England
Troon F.C., a Scottish football club
Troon railway station (disambiguation), former and present railway stations
Troon Tornadoes, a Scottish basketball club
, a ship name of the British Royal Navy

See also

 
 
 Royal Troon Golf Club, Troon, Scotland, UK
 Kilmarnock and Troon Railway, Scotland, UK